Pole or poles may refer to:

Astronomy
Celestial pole, the projection of the planet Earth's axis of rotation onto the celestial sphere; also applies to the axis of rotation of other planets
Pole star, a visible star that is approximately aligned with the Earth's axis of rotation
Orbital pole, the projection of the line perpendicular to planet Earth's orbit onto the celestial sphere; also applies to the orbit of other planets
Poles of astronomical bodies, concepts analogous to the Earth's geographic and magnetic poles on other planets and Solar System bodies

Cylindrical objects
A solid cylindrical object or column with its length greater than its diameter, for example:
Asherah pole, a sacred tree or pole that stood near Canaanite religious locations to honor the Ugaritic mother-goddess Asherah, consort of El
Barber's pole, advertising the barber shop
Ceremonial pole or festival pole symbolizes a variety of concepts in several different cultures
Fireman's pole, wooden pole or a metal tube or pipe installed between floors in fire stations
Flagpole (structure), metal pole from which a flag is hung
Gin pole, a supported pole which uses a pulley or block and tackle on its upper end to lift loads
Lamppost, a raised source of light on the edge of a road
Quant pole, a pole used for pushing barges or punts
Setting pole, a pole used for propelling boats in shallow waters
Pole (surveying), used in geographical surveying
Totem pole, monumental sculptures carved from great trees
Trolley pole
Utility pole, also called a telephone pole, telegraph pole or power pole, a pole that carries utility wires
Poles used in sporting and other activities:
Dance pole, a pole used for pole dancing and pole sports
Danish pole, a circus prop
Festivus pole, a pole used in the celebration of Festivus that is traditionally made of aluminium
Fishing pole, tool used to catch fish
Foul pole, used in the sport of baseball to distinguish foul balls from fair balls hit into the outfield
Maypole, a tall wooden pole with ornaments, like ribbons, that is danced around
Pole bending, a rodeo event that involves riding a horse around six poles arranged in a line
Pole position, in motorsport, the position at the front of the starting grid (originally marked with a pole)
Polesaw, a saw attached to a pole for cutting tree branches
Pole-sitting pole, a pole used for pole sitting, which is the practice of sitting on a pole for extended lengths of time
Pole vaulting pole, a pole used for pole vaulting
Pole weapon, combat weapon in which the main fighting part of the weapon is placed on the end of a long shaft, typically of wood
Ski pole, a pole used by skiers to improve balance, speed and acceleration
Spinnaker pole, a spar used in sailboats to help support and control a variety of headsails, particularly the spinnaker
Trekking pole, also called hiking sticks or hiking poles, a pole used for hiking

Geography and places
Geographical pole, either of two fixed points on the surface of a spinning body or planet, at 90 degrees from the equator, based on the axis around which a body spins
North Pole, the northernmost point on the surface of the Earth, where the Earth's axis of rotation intersects the Earth's surface
Polar circle, either of two circles of latitude marking the extreme southerly points (northern hemisphere) or northerly points (southern hemisphere) at which the sun may remain above or below the horizon for 24 continuous hours at some point during the year
Polar region, the region within the polar circles, referred to as the Arctic and Antarctic
South Pole, the southernmost point on the surface of the Earth, where the Earth's axis of rotation intersects the Earth's surface
Ceremonial South Pole, an area set aside for photo opportunities at the South Pole Station
Magnetic poles of astronomical bodies
North Magnetic Pole, the shifting point on the Earth to which the "north" end of a dipole magnet points
South Magnetic Pole, the shifting point on the Earth to which the "south" end of a dipole magnet points
The Tibetan Plateau, also known as the "Third Pole"
Mount Everest, the third "top" of the Earth and part of the Three Poles Challenge
Pole of inaccessibility, a location that is the most challenging to reach owing to its remoteness from geographical features which could provide access
Pole, Lubusz Voivodeship (west Poland)
Pole, Botswana, a village in the North East District of Botswana
The West Pole, Texas
Hanbury Manor, Ware, Hertfordshire, formerly known as "Poles"
 Poles, a place in the Highland council area of Scotland

Fictional

"East Pole" and "West Pole", imaginary locations; Christopher Robin tells Winnie-the-Pooh that these exist as well but "people don't like talking about them"

Science, technology, and mathematics
 Pole (electrical circuits) - In electrical circuit theory, a circuit terminal, either physical or abstract
 Electric battery terminals
 In switch contact terminology, the number of circuits controlled by a switch
Pole (unit of length), a unit of length equal to 5 yards, or 16 feet (5.0292 metres): also known as a rod, or a perch
Landau pole, the energy scale where a coupling constant of a quantum field theory becomes infinite
Magnetic pole, one of the two ends of a magnet
 Monopole (disambiguation), multiple definitions
 Mathematics
 Pole, one of the pair of antipodal points 90° away from a great circle on a sphere.
Pole (complex analysis), a certain type of mathematical singularity
An element of the configuration of perspective triangles
Pole and polar, a point that describes the position and orientation of a line with respect to a given circle
Pole and polar line, a duality with respect to conic sections in projective geometry
 Mechanics
 Pole, or origin of planes, a certain point on the Mohr's circle, used in stress analysis of materials
 Meteorology
Polar climate, the climate of the polar regions, characterized by a lack of warm summers
Polar front, the boundary region between the polar cell and the Ferrel cell in each hemisphere
 Pole figure, a method for representing crystal symmetry
 Prospective Outlook on Long-term Energy Systems (POLES)

Psychology and biology
Anterior and posterior poles, surface vertices of the eye's lens
Fetal pole, a thickening on the margin of the yolk sac of a fetus during pregnancy
Pole of kidney
POLE (gene), a DNA polymerase epsilon catalytic subunit – enzyme that in humans is encoded by the POLE gene
Cell (biology), either extremity of the main axis of a nucleus, cell, or organism. Important structures situated close to such extremities have also been regarded as poles (e.g. animal cell centrosomes).
East Pole–West Pole divide, an intellectual schism between researchers in the fields of cognitive psychology and cognitive neuroscience

Music
Pole (musician), an electronica solo project by Stefan Betke
Pole (Stockhausen), a 1970 composition by Karlheinz Stockhausen
 Pole (album)

Names and people
Poles (people), another term for Polish people, those originating from, or inhabiting, the country of Poland
Pole (surname)
Pole (musician), an electronic music artist named Stefan Betke
Spot Poles (1887–1962), American outfielder in baseball's Negro leagues

Fictional characters
Pole, an opponent in the video game Yie Ar Kung-Fu
Jill Pole, a fictional character from C. S. Lewis' Chronicles of Narnia series

Politics
Pole (Venezuela) (Polo), a political party in Venezuela

See also

 
 
Axle
Polar (disambiguation)
Polarity (disambiguation)
Polarization (disambiguation)
Pohl (disambiguation)
Pohle (disambiguation)
Pol (disambiguation)
Poles (disambiguation)
Poll (disambiguation)
Quarterstaff
Rod (disambiguation)
Shaft (disambiguation)
Staff (disambiguation)
Stick (disambiguation)

nl:Wandelstok#Poles